Carlos Nazario (born 17 June 1958) is a former Puerto Rican swimmer who competed in the 1976 Summer Olympics.
He is married to Rosa A. Nazario who also swam for Puerto Rico. Together they have a daughter named Carla Michelle Nazario.

References

1958 births
Living people
Puerto Rican male swimmers
Male breaststroke swimmers
Olympic swimmers of Puerto Rico
Swimmers at the 1976 Summer Olympics